The Ministry of Justice of Laos existed as far back as the Royal Lao Government (1940s). It was not until the first Laos government in 1975 that the ministry took a more active role in the creation and operation of the judiciary, court system, and the rights and freedoms of Laotian citizens. Additionally, the Prime Minister might guide the Ministry of Justice's role in regards to the legislative branch, the dissemination of law, and the promotion of legal education (e.g., law schools).

List of ministers

First Coalition Government 

 Thongdi Sounthonvichit (1957)
 Thao Leaum Insisiengmay (1958)

Government of Phuy Xananikôn 

 Ngon Sananikone (1959-1960)

Second Coalition Government 

 Inpeng Suryadhay (1964-1971)

 Souvanna Phouma (1972-1973)

Lao People's Democratic Republic 

 Khamking Souvanlasy (1974-1975)
 Kou Souvannemethi (1976-1992)
 Kham Ouane Boupha (1992-2005)
 Chaleuan Yapaoher (2006-2016)
 Xaysi Santivong (2016-present)

See also 

 Justice ministry
 Politics of Laos

References 

Justice ministries
Ministries of the Government of Laos